Harshad Deepak Meher (born 9 January 1992 in Colaba, Maharashtra) is an Indian footballer who plays as a goalkeeper for Kerala Blasters in the Indian Super League. He grew up in Mumbai.

Career

Air India
After spending his youth career with Mahindra United and Bengal Mumbai FC Harshad joined I-League side Air India FC in August 2011. He made his professional debut on 11 April 2012 against Prayag United in which Air India drew 0–0.

Mahindra United U-19 2006-08 (Youth League)

PIFA Colaba 2008- 10 (AIFF 2nd Division League)

Bengal Mumbai FC 2010- 11 ( 2nd Division League)

Air India 2011- 13 (I-League)

Sporting Club De Goa 2013- 14 (I-League)

Kalyani Bharat FC 2014- 15 (I-League)

Central Railway 2015- 18 (MDFA Super Division)

Maharashtra 2011- 18 (Sr. & Youth National Leagues)

Kerala Blasters FC 2018 (Toyota Yaris La Liga World Pre-

Season Football Tournament)

Represented India U-16 at Germany and competed against top teams like FC

Bayern Munich, Stuttgart FC & Augsburg FC at respective age groups in 2006.

Represented India U-16 for the Asia Cup at UAE.

Represented PIFA & Mumbai Challengers for the Gauteng Future Championship

at South Africa between 2008 & 2009 respectively.

Emerged Runner Up with Sporting Club De Goa at the Federation Cup in 2013.

Captained Air India to a successful campaign at the Durand Cup in 2012.

Emerged as the Best Goalkeeper at the Governors Gold Cup which was

organized by Sikkim Football Association in 2010.

Emerged as the Best Goalkeeper by Mumbai District Football Association at

Senior Division level in 2016.

Emerged Runner Up with Team Maharashtra at the 70th Santosh Trophy in

2016.

Career statistics

Club

CS- Clean Sheets

References

External links
 Profile at Goal.com
 Profile at I-league.org

Indian footballers
1992 births
Living people
Footballers from Mumbai
I-League players
Air India FC players
Sporting Clube de Goa players
India youth international footballers
Association football goalkeepers
Bengal Mumbai FC players